William Mostyn (June 5, 1836– March 30, 1881) was an Irish-born doctor and political figure in Ontario. He represented Lanark North in the Legislative Assembly of Ontario from 1875 to 1879 as a Conservative member. He drowned at the age of 44.

Of Welsh descent, he was born in Elphin, County Roscommon and came to Upper Canada with his parents in 1837. Mostyn was educated in Kingston and received his M.D. from Queen's University in 1858. He served as a surgeon for the militia. Mostyn was president of the North Lanark Agricultural Society. He served three years as reeve of Almonte and 15 years as assistant coroner for Lanark Ontario. Mostyn was also a district Grand Master in the Freemasons.

References

External links

1836 births
1881 deaths
Deaths by drowning in Canada
Progressive Conservative Party of Ontario MPPs
Canadian coroners
People from Almonte, Ontario
Mayors of places in Ontario